Lucheng is a town and the seat of Chuxiong City, Yunnan, People's Republic of China. , it has 15 residential communities and six villages under its administration.

References

Township-level divisions of Chuxiong Yi Autonomous Prefecture